Armstrong Wood is a 9 hectare, woodland and nature reserve located south of the village of Trebullett and Launceston, Cornwall managed by the Cornwall Wildlife Trust (CWT). The site is not open to the public and is permit only. The site is noted for the presence of silver-washed fritillary, butterfly and otters.

References

External links
 Chycor - Armstrong Wood 
 Launceston Area Parish Wildlife Group, Bat and dormouse quest

Bibliography
 

Environment of Cornwall
Geography of Cornwall
Forests and woodlands of Cornwall
Nature reserves of the Cornwall Wildlife Trust